Oleg Viktorovich Avramov (born 3 October 1968 in Bryansk) is a former Russian football player.

Honours
Vedrich Rechytsa
Belarusian Cup finalist: 1992/93

References

1968 births
Living people
Soviet footballers
Russian footballers
Association football goalkeepers
FC Kuban Krasnodar players
Russian Premier League players
FC Rechitsa-2014 players
Russian expatriate footballers
Expatriate footballers in Belarus
FC Dynamo Bryansk players
FC Torpedo Minsk players
FC Metalist Kharkiv players
Sportspeople from Bryansk